Eucytheridae is a family of crustaceans belonging to the order Podocopida.

Genera

Genera:
 Aaleniella Plumhoff, 1963
 Aphelocythere Triebel & Klingler, 1959
 Cytheropsis M'Coy, 1849

References

Podocopida